Aimé Joseph Lavie Mienandy (born 7 December 1984) is a French former professional footballer who played as a centre-back.

Career
Born in Montpellier, Lavie began playing football with the youth side of FC Sochaux-Montbéliard. He played four matches in Ligue 1 for Sochaux between 2003 and 2005. He played 15 matches in Ligue 2 for Sète in the 2005–06 season.

He played for F.C. Ryūkyū in the Japan Football League in 2008. In July 2009, he moved to Hakoah Ramat Gan.

Personal life
Aimé's younger brother, Ted, has also played football professionally.

References

External links
 
 
 

1984 births
Living people
French sportspeople of Republic of the Congo descent
Footballers from Montpellier
French footballers
Association football central defenders
Ligue 1 players
Ligue 2 players
Israeli Premier League players
FC Sochaux-Montbéliard players
FC Sète 34 players
AS Cannes players
Maccabi Petah Tikva F.C. players
Hapoel Kfar Saba F.C. players
Hakoah Maccabi Amidar Ramat Gan F.C. players
Black French sportspeople